Alain Guiraudie (born 15 July 1964) is a French film director and screenwriter. He has directed ten mostly LGBT-related films since 1990. He is openly gay.

Work
Guiraudie has named Georges Bataille as an important influence. His 2013 film Stranger by the Lake was screened in the Un Certain Regard section at the 2013 Cannes Film Festival where he won the award for Best Director.

In 2014 he won the Prix Sade for his novel Now the Night Begins (Ici commence la nuit).

Filmography

References

External links

1964 births
Living people
French film directors
French male screenwriters
LGBT film directors
People from Villefranche-de-Rouergue
French gay writers
21st-century French LGBT people
21st-century French novelists
21st-century French screenwriters
21st-century French male writers
French male novelists
French LGBT novelists